The Tolypothrichaceae are a family of cyanobacteria.

References

Nostocales
Cyanobacteria families